Carl T. Bogus (born May 14, 1948 in Fall River, Massachusetts) is an author and Distinguished Research Professor of Law at Roger Williams University School of Law in Rhode Island.

Education and career
Bogus received both his J.D. and A.B. degrees from Syracuse University. He joined the faculty of Roger Williams University School of Law in 1996 as an associate professor, and became a full professor there in 2002.

Work
Bogus is known for his work on antitrust law and the Second Amendment to the United States Constitution. He has written two books: Buckley: William F. Buckley Jr. and the Rise of American Conservatism (Bloomsbury Press 2011) and Why Lawsuits Are Good for America: Big Business, Disciplined Democracy and the Common Law (NYU Press 2001). Despite the fact that he is politically liberal, in Buckley, Bogus still acknowledges that he admires him for the wit and personality he displayed during his life.

Honors and awards
Bogus has received the Ross Essay Award from the American Bar Association and the Public Service Achievement Award from Common Cause of Rhode Island.

Personal life
Bogus is married to Cynthia J. Giles, with whom he has three children. He enjoys playing chess in his spare time.

References

External links

Roger Williams University faculty
1948 births
Living people
People from Fall River, Massachusetts
Syracuse University College of Law alumni
American scholars of constitutional law